Rajan Somasundaram, best known as Composer Rajan, is a composer, drummer, violinist and music producer based in Raleigh.
He is known for making the first ever music album on Tamil Sangam period poetry in association with Durham Symphony and prominent international musicians. The album became Amazon's Top#10 bestseller under 'International Music albums' category in July 2020. The album was called a "A Major event in the world of Music" by The Hindu Music review.
He composed the theme song of the 10th World Tamil Conference with many international musicians as a tribute to Sangam period poet Kaniyan Pungundranar.

Early life and education 
Rajan was born in Thiruvarur in Tamil Nadu state and started learning Carnatic music since he was 9 years old at the birthplace of Shyama Shastri. He graduated with a master's degree in Engineering.

Career 
In 2017, Rajan created a new Carnatic Raga, Svadhya, and released a single titled ‘Maya- The reflection of Self’ composed in the raga. In 2018, he released the first ever musical form for the prominent Sanskrit Advaita classical literature, Ashtavakra Gita Saksi I, in the raga Svadhya. Rajan has worked on jingles, corporate commercials and documentaries including 'Welcome to North Carolina'.

Rajan composed the theme song of the 10th World Tamil Conference scheduled at Chicago. He has composed the first ever musical form for the 2000 year old poetry, Yathum Oore, written by Sangam Period poet Kaniyan Pungundranar. Rajan mentioned that as a tribute to one of the most progressive ancient poetry that calls for unity and equality, he composed the theme song to cover multiple genres of music and brought in many international musicians of varying genres, ethnicity and languages. Singers Karthik (singer) and academy nominated Bombay Jayashri sang the song along with various international artists.  Tamil writer S. Ramakrishnan appreciated the selection of Yathum Oore poem as the theme song to portray the Tamil cultural identity.

In January 2020, Rajan released the first ever music album on ancient Tamil Sangam poetry collaborating with Durham Symphony and leading international artists, titled Sandham- Symphony Meets Classical Tamil. The Hindu music review called the album "A Major event in the world of Music".

His Pop-Rock single 'Girl Power' sung by KiRA Mazur became Top#10 most requested song on Chicago FM in June 2021. His background score for the documentary movie 'Anthara nadai' on Poet Abi was widely appreciated.

Rajan's music for the movie 'A Tribute to Venmurasu' featuring legendary Actor Kamal Haasan among others was released by Movie Director Mani Ratnam in a virtual public event. The movie taken to celebrate the successful completion of World's longest Tamil Novel Venmurasu was developed into a music album titled A Musical Tribute to Venmurasu includes a 12 minute musical tribute sung by Kamal Haasan, Sriram Parthasarathy, Saindhavi and Rajan Somasundaram. Rajan selected some highly poetic lines from Neelam, one of the Venmurasu Novels and created this Musical tribute. Writers A.Muttulingam, Director Vasanthabalan and Nanjil Nadan appreciated the unique combination of melody, rhythm and grandeur in creating a fitting musical tribute to Venmurasu.  The album was released worldwide through Apple iTunes and Spotify.

References

External links 
Official YouTube Channel

Living people
Carnatic composers
21st-century Indian composers
Year of birth missing (living people)